Jankowa may refer to the following places in Poland:
Jankowa, Lower Silesian Voivodeship (south-west Poland)
Jankowa, Lublin Voivodeship (east Poland)
Jankowa, Lesser Poland Voivodeship (south Poland)